The Allgemeine Zeitung was the leading political daily journal in Germany in the first part of the 19th century. It has been widely recognised as the first world-class German journal and a symbol of the German press abroad.

The Allgemeine Zeitung ( ‘general newspaper’) was founded in 1798 by Johann Friedrich Cotta in Tübingen.  The works of Schiller and Goethe were published on its pages.

After 1803, the journal was published in Stuttgart.  From 1807 to 1882, it was published in Augsburg.

Heinrich Heine was a major contributor to the journal.  From 1831 he wrote reports on music and painting and became the newspaper's Parisian correspondent.  He wrote articles on the French way of life but also about Louis-Philippe and German politics.

In 1882, the Allgemeine Zeitung moved to Munich.  The journal stopped publishing on 29 July 1929.

The tradition of this major journal is still maintained by the Augsburger Allgemeine Zeitung, Frankfurter Allgemeine Zeitung and the Allgemeine Zeitung edited in Mainz.

References
In German:
 Eduard Heyck: Die Allgemeine Zeitung 1798-1898 in: Beiträge zur Geschichte der deutschen Presse. München 1898, pp. 15–81.
 Karl Schottenloher: Flugblatt und Zeitung. Ein Wegweiser durch das gedruckte Tagesschrifttum, Vol. 1: Von den Anfängen bis 1848, Berlin, Schmidt 1922. Newly edited and expanded by J. Binkowski, München, Klinkhardt und Biermann 1985, 
 Arnulf Kutsch, Johannes Weber: 350 Jahre Tageszeitung, Forschungen und Dokumente. Bremen 2002.

1798 establishments in the Holy Roman Empire
1929 disestablishments in Germany
Defunct newspapers published in Germany
German-language newspapers
Mass media in Augsburg
Publications established in 1798
Publications disestablished in 1929
18th-century establishments in Württemberg